Trachytrema is a genus of spiders in the family Trachycosmidae. It was first described in 1909 by Simon. , it contains 2 Australian species.

References

Trochanteriidae
Araneomorphae genera
Spiders of Australia